The Department of Commerce Gold Medal is the highest honor award of the United States Department of Commerce. Since 1949, the Department of Commerce Gold Medal is presented by the Secretary of Commerce for distinguished performance. The award may be presented to an individual, group, or organization in the Commerce Department for extraordinary, noble, or prestigious contributions that impact the mission of the department and/or one or more operating units, which reflects favorable on the department.

The annual Department of Commerce Gold Medal Awards ceremony is held each fall at the Ronald Reagan Amphitheater in Washington, D.C. An Individual and members of a group which is awarded the Gold Medal Award are each presented a framed certificate signed by the Secretary and medal. An organization receiving the award is presented one framed certificate signed by the Secretary and medal.

Award criteria 
The Gold Medal Award is awarded for distinguished performance characterized by extraordinary, noble, or prestigious contributions that impact the mission of the Department of Commerce and/or one or more of its operating units, which reflects favorably on the department.

To warrant a gold medal, a contribution must focus on qualitative and quantitative performance measures reflected in the Department of Commerce's strategic plan and be identified in one of the following areas:

 Leadership
 Personal and professional excellence
 Scientific/engineering achievement
 Organizational development
 Customer service
 Administrative/technical support or
 Heroism

Appearance
The obverse of the medal bears a modified version of the obverse of the Great Seal of the United States. Around the edge are the words DEPARTMENT OF COMMERCE above and UNITED STATES OF AMERICA below. The reverse is blank when worn from a suspension ribbon.

NOAA Corps recipients 
The NOAA Corps is eligible to send an overall total of 20 Gold and Silver nominations to the Department of Commerce per year. The gold medal is awarded to an individual, group, or organization for extraordinary achievements in support of the critical objectives of the Department of Commerce with a significant beneficial effect on the Nation or world.

To warrant the award of the gold medal, a contribution to the Commerce Department must meet at least one of the following criteria:
Achievement of critical program goals far exceeding expectations, marked by noteworthy creativity, energy, or persistence, contributing significantly to the welfare of the United States.
Exceedingly outstanding leadership or management that resulting in dramatic improvements to productivity, program effectiveness, or quality of the Department of Commerce's service to the United States.
Scientific or technological breakthroughs resolving longstanding problems or radically advance the state of the art.
Highly distinguished authorship or editorship affecting the primary principles of the discipline covered, opening up new fields of inquiry, or redefining major issues of investigation.
Heroic action involving jeopardy of life.

The NOAA awardees of the Gold Medal Award are presented a medallion by the Commerce Department and the NOAA Commissioned Corps awardees are presented a full sized military style medal, miniature medal, and a full and miniature size service ribbon provided from the Commissioned Personnel Center. Group or organizational recipients of the gold medal are authorized to wear a silver  inch "O" device on the full size medal's suspension ribbon and service ribbon. Each additional award of the gold medal is denoted by a  inch gold star for the full size medal suspension ribbon and service ribbon and a  inch gold star for the miniature medal suspension ribbon.

Individual and group members also receive a framed certificate signed by the Secretary of Commerce. Members of an organization awarded the gold medal each receive the award and the organization receives one framed certificate signed by the Secretary to represent the entire organization.

Notable recipients
People
 Jonathan W. Bailey
 Tim Foecke
 John L. Hall
 Diana Josephson
 Don A. Jones
 Shirley Kallek
 Lauren S. McCready
 Harley D. Nygren
 Ida Rhodes
 Franklin E. Roach
 Naomi D. Rothwell
 Michael J. Silah
 Shepard M. Smith
 Irene Stegun
 Beatrice N. Vaccara
Organizations
 NOAAS Oregon II (R 332)

Select Recipients by Year

2002 

 Roy W. Anderson, Michael L. Aslaksen, Jr., Jason Wyatt Woolard, Edward E. Carlson, Stephen A. Nicklas, William B. Kearse, Jonathan W. Bailey, Michael S. Weaver, William R. Odell, AOC NMAO NGS NOS: For mapping the wreckage site of the World Trade Center and the Pentagon following the September 11, 2001, terrorist attacks.
 Michael B. Brown, Marc E. Higgins, David R. Myers, David MacFarland, Nicholas E. Perugini, OCS NOS: For developing and implementing the Electronic Navigational Chart (ENC) program at NOAA.
 Direct Services Division SARSAT Team, International and Interagency Affairs Office, NESDIS: For leading the effort to improve the effectiveness of the worldwide Search and Rescue (SAR) operations.
 Daniel L. Albritton, Edward J. Dlugokencky, Daniel M. Murphy, Venkatachalam Ramaswamy, Susan Solomon, Ronald J. Stouffer, OAR, Thomas Karl, NCDC NESDIS: For authoring a report entitled Climate Change 2001: The Scientific Basis, by the Intergovernmental Panel on Climate Change, a definitive evaluation of the current scientific knowledge concerning global climate change.
 Margarita Gregg, Timothy Boyer, Todd O’Brien, Catherine Stephens, Daphne Johnson, Sydney Levitus, NODC NESDIS: For unprecedented compilation of historical oceanographic observations leading to the publication of World Ocean Database 1998 and accompanying atlas.
 Dale Squired, NMFS: For establishing unprecedented methods to systematically plan and evaluate reductions in fishing capacity.
 Scott Doyle, Sara Block, James Cassin, Jr., Christopher Musto, Steven Niemi, Jeffrey Ray, NMFS: For courageous and self-sacrificing acts assisting in the bucket brigades at the World Trade Center site following the September 11, 2001, terrorist attacks.
 Michael L. Gill, Richard N. Fallin, NWS: For saving the life of a pilot who was trapped in an overturned plane leaking fuel at Russel, Kansas.
 Donald A. King, Andrew P. Justis, NWS: For providing life-saving assistance to a man who flipped an all terrain vehicle and hit a tree in a remote area of Coconino National Forest near Flagstaff, Arizona.
 WFO Houston/Galveston, Texas, NWS: For providing critical life-saving information during catastrophic flooding in Houston, Texas, during and after Tropical Storm Allison that limited the loss of life in the area.
 WFO Upton, New York, WFO Sterling, Virginia, NWS: For their support to emergency management following the September 11, 2001, terrorist attacks.

2001 

 Robert W. Embley, PMEL OAR: For pioneering research in exploring deep ocean volcanic ecosystems leading to the establishment of the world's first deep seafloor observatory.
 Radar Meteorology and Oceanography Division, ETL OAR: For the theoretical, experimental, and engineering advances that led to the development of a new technology – an autonomous, ground-based, remote-sensing system to unambiguously detect dangerous in-flight icing conditions in clouds.
 Donald Scavia, NOS: For his pivotal role in achieving passage and implementation of the harmful Algal Bloom and Hypoxia Research and Control Act of 1998
 Allan J. Coker, NMFS, Cynthia S. Fenyk, Office of the Under Secretary: For enforcement work in identifying, investigating and prosecuting extensive and complex violations within the red snapper fishery.
 William G. Conner, Carol Ann Manen, David John Chapman, Norman F. Meade, Lisa M. Dipinto, John D. Cubit, NOS, Katherine Ann Pease, Office of the Under Secretary, Mark Helvey, NMFS: Montrose Case Team members, for the extraordinary personal commitment needed to successfully address 50 years of DDT contamination off the California coast.
 Thomas A. Flagg, Deborah A. Frost, William C. McAuley, Michael R. Wastel, NMFS: The Redfish Lake Sockeye Salmon Captive Broodstock team, for developing captive rearing broodstock technologies that prevented extinction of the Pacific Northwest's most endangered salmon stock, Redfish Lake sockeye salmon.
 Paul A. Jendrowski, NWS: For developing and implementing the Areal Mean basin Estimated Rainfall (AMBER) system to detect and diagnose flash flood potential.
 Office of Satellite Operations, NESDIS: For launching, validating and activating three independent weather satellites over one 12-month period.
 Scott A. Doyle, NMFS: For investigative excellence for a two-year investigation into the unlawful harvest of Striped Bass from the Hudson River and its subsequent sale in interstate commerce.
 Mark H. Pickett, NMFS Pacific Grove Laboratory and Office of Marine and Aviation Operations: For courage and heroism in saving the lives of two U.S. Geological Survey employees after the capsizing of the Channel Islands NMS R/V Ballena on November 4, 2000.

2000 

 Evelyn J. Fields, Office of Marine and Aircraft Operations: For leadership, initiative, and dedication in advancing public awareness of NOAA missions and accomplishments.
 Bruce B. Parker, NOS: For scientific leadership in conceiving and developing a new program for oceanographic real-time and forecast model systems for ports and bays.
 Dennis K. Clark, NESDIS: For achievements in the field of satellite remote sensing of ocean color including development of the Marine Optical Buoy System for ground-truthing satellite observed ocean color. 
 Tilden Payne Meyers, OAR: For work in improving the measurement and prediction of air-surface exchanges of fundamental quantities such as heat, water vapor, carbon dioxide, and various pollutants.
 Petrus P. Tans, OAR: For research in the area of global greenhouse gas measurements and studies leading to a clarification of the importance of the terrestrial biosphere in the global carbon cycle.
 Gary C. Matlock, Maria Josephina Uitterhoeve, Sarah A. McLaughlin, Mark A. Murray-Brown, Pasquale J. Scida, Ronald G. Rinaldo, Rebecca J. Lent, Michael B. Fraser, Mariam E. McCall, NMFS and GC: Development of a financially self-sustaining electronic licensing and permitting system for both commercial and recreational fishing. 
 Hydrometeorological Prediction Center, NWSFO Newport, NC, NWSFO Wakefield, VA, NWSFO Raleigh, NC, NWSFO Wilmington, NC, Southeast River Forecast Center: For their efforts in the early recognition of the disastrous impacts from Hurricane Floyd resulting in saving countless lives.

References

 
Awards and decorations of the United States Department of Commerce
Awards established in 1949
1949 establishments in the United States